Dejan Djuranović (born 5 May 1968) is a Slovenian professional football manager and former player.

Djuranović was capped for the Slovenian national team.

External links

1968 births
Living people
People from Postojna
Yugoslav footballers
Slovenian footballers
Association football midfielders
Slovenian PrvaLiga players
NK Olimpija Ljubljana (1945–2005) players
ND Gorica players
NK Maribor players
NK Domžale players
FK Laktaši players
Slovenian expatriate footballers
Slovenian expatriate sportspeople in Bosnia and Herzegovina
Expatriate footballers in Bosnia and Herzegovina
Slovenia international footballers
Slovenian football managers
NK Domžale managers